In geometry, the 5-cubic honeycomb or penteractic honeycomb is the only regular space-filling tessellation (or honeycomb) in Euclidean 5-space. Four 5-cubes meet at each cubic cell, and it is more explicitly called an order-4 penteractic honeycomb.

It is analogous to the square tiling of the plane and to the cubic honeycomb of 3-space, and the tesseractic honeycomb of 4-space.

Constructions 
There are many different Wythoff constructions of this honeycomb. The most symmetric form is regular, with Schläfli symbol {4,33,4}. Another form has two alternating 5-cube facets (like a checkerboard) with Schläfli symbol {4,3,3,31,1}. The lowest symmetry Wythoff construction has 32 types of facets around each vertex and a prismatic product Schläfli symbol {∞}5.

Related polytopes and honeycombs 
The [4,33,4], Coxeter group generates 63 permutations of uniform tessellations, 35 with unique symmetry and 34 with unique geometry. The expanded 5-cubic honeycomb is geometrically identical to the 5-cubic honeycomb.

The 5-cubic honeycomb can be alternated into the 5-demicubic honeycomb, replacing the 5-cubes with 5-demicubes, and the alternated gaps are filled by 5-orthoplex facets.

It is also related to the regular 6-cube which exists in 6-space with 3 5-cubes on each cell. This could be considered as a tessellation on the 5-sphere, an order-3 penteractic honeycomb, {4,34}.

Tritruncated 5-cubic honeycomb 
A tritruncated 5-cubic honeycomb, contains all bitruncated 5-orthoplex facets and is the Voronoi tessellation of the D5* lattice.

See also 
List of regular polytopes

Regular and uniform honeycombs in 5-space:
5-demicubic honeycomb
5-simplex honeycomb
Truncated 5-simplex honeycomb
Omnitruncated 5-simplex honeycomb

References 
 Coxeter, H.S.M. Regular Polytopes, (3rd edition, 1973), Dover edition,  p. 296, Table II: Regular honeycombs
 Kaleidoscopes: Selected Writings of H. S. M. Coxeter, edited by F. Arthur Sherk, Peter McMullen, Anthony C. Thompson, Asia Ivic Weiss, Wiley-Interscience Publication, 1995,  
 (Paper 24) H.S.M. Coxeter, Regular and Semi-Regular Polytopes III, [Math. Zeit. 200 (1988) 3-45]

Honeycombs (geometry)
6-polytopes
Regular tessellations